Hypopigmentation is characterized specifically as an area of skin becoming lighter than the baseline skin color, but not completely devoid of pigment. This is not to be confused with depigmentation, which is characterized as the absence of all pigment.  It is caused by melanocyte or melanin depletion, or a decrease in the amino acid tyrosine, which is used by melanocytes to make melanin. Some common genetic causes include mutations in the tyrosinase gene or OCA2 gene.  As melanin pigments tend to be in the skin, eye, and hair, these are the commonly affected areas in those with hypopigmentation.

Hypopigmentation is common and approximately one in twenty have at least one hypopigmented macule. Hypopigmentation can be upsetting to some, especially those with darker skin whose hypopigmentation marks are seen more visibly. Most causes of hypopigmentation are not serious and can be easily treated.

Presentation

Associated conditions
It is seen in:
 Albinism
 Idiopathic guttate hypomelanosis
 Leprosy
 Leucism
 Phenylketonuria
 Pityriasis alba
 Vitiligo
 Angelman syndrome
 Tinea versicolor
 Yaws
 An uncommon adverse effect of imatinib therapy
 Injections of high concentrations of corticosteroids (transient)

Diagnosis
Areas of lighter pigmentation can be indications of hypopigmentation. Biopsies and genetic information are also used to diagnose.

Treatments
Often, hypopigmentation can be brought on by laser treatments; however, the hypopigmentation can be treated with other lasers or light sources. Micropigmentation can also be used to obtain a more normal appearance of the hypopigmentated skin.

Treatment for hypopigmentation depends on the initial cause of the discoloration.

See also
 Hyperpigmentation

References

External links 

Dermatologic terminology
Disturbances of human pigmentation